Juan David Cabezas Núñez (born 27 February 1991) is a Colombian professional footballer who currently plays for USL Championship side Rio Grande Valley FC .

Club career

Deportivo Cali 
Cabezas joined the Deportivo Cali in 2000, spending 9 years in the academy. Cabezaz made his first team debut for Deportivo Cali in a Categoria Primera A match on 7 March 2009, coming on as a sub in a 2–1 win against Junior. He would pick up 2 more appearances that year.

The following season Cabezas went on loan to fellow Primera A club Cúcuta Deportivo. He made 6 league appearances before going out on loan again the following year, this time to La Equidad He got his first taste of the Copa Sudamericana while with La Equidad, getting a start in a 1–0 defeat to Club Libertad on 14 September 2011

Cabezas returned to Deportivo Cali in 2011, but only made 27 appearances before going out on loan again, this time to Once Caldes. He helped Los Albos qualify for the playoffs in both seasons with the club.

Deportivo Cali gave Cabezas another chance in 2014 and he didn't disappoint. The club reached the playoffs in 2014 and 2015 and he helped them become 2015 Apertura Champions.

In 2016, looking for more consistent game time, Cabezas went on loan to Independiente Medellín. He became a key player for DIM. In the 2016 Apertura finals against Junior, Cabezas scored the equalizing goal in the first leg, They went on to win 3–1 on aggregate.

Houston Dynamo 
Cabezaz Joined the Dynamo and on loan for the 2017 season. He quickly established himself as a key figure in countryman Wilmer Cabrerea's side, getting his MLS debut by coming off the bench in the second match of the season. He recorded his first Dynamo goal on 29 July, an equalizer in a 2–2 draw with the Portland Timbers. After helping lead the Dynamo to the MLS Playoffs, Cabezas played every minute as Houston reached the Conference Finals. His strong season saw him be named team MVP for the 2017 season.  Wilmer Cabrera described Cabezas as "a top player in the midfield for us and is a natural ball winner."  The Dynamo rewarded his good performances by acquiring him on a permanent deal in December 2017.

Cabezas was plagued with injuries in 2018. In the first game of the season, he picked up a thigh muscle strain, forcing him to come off after 15 minutes and causing him to miss the next 9 games. In his first game since back from injury, he picked up another thigh injury that caused him to miss over 3 months and 20 games. Later he picked up another muscle injury that caused him to miss the final 3 games of the season. The team greatly missed him throughout the season,  going 5-1-1 across all competitions when Cabezas played while only going 6-7-15 across all competitions in games Cabezas missed.

The Dynamo and Cabezas opened 2019 on 19 February with a CONCACAF Champions League match against CD Guastatoya. Despite Houston getting the 1-0 win, Cabezaa was forced off due to picking up an injury. After making 2 appearances with the Dynamo's USL Championship affiliate Rio Grande Valley FC to regain fitness, Cabezas returned to the Dynamo lineup on 13 April in a 2-1 win over the San Jose Earthquakes. He would find the back of the net for his second goal as a Dynamo on 9 August in a 3-2 defeat to New York City FC. On 11 September, Cabezas injured his knee after a reckless challenge from an opponent. The Dynamo would go onto defeat Minnesota United 2-0, but Cabezas would miss the rest of the season.

On 21 November, Cabezas had his contract option declined.

Rio Grande Valley FC 
On 7 April 2021, Cabezas returned to Rio Grande Valley FC, signing a contract for the 2021 season.

Personal
Cabezas received his U.S. green card in January 2019, which qualifies him as a domestic player for MLS roster purposes.
He is also a very nice person.

Career Statistics

Honors

Club 
Deportivo Cali

Categoría Primera A: 2015-I

Independiente Medellín

Categoría Primera A: 2016-I

Houston Dynamo

US Open Cup: 2018

Individual 
Houston Dynamo

Dynamo Team MVP: 2017

References

1991 births
Living people
Colombian footballers
Colombia under-20 international footballers
Deportivo Cali footballers
Cúcuta Deportivo footballers
La Equidad footballers
Once Caldas footballers
Independiente Medellín footballers
Houston Dynamo FC players
Rio Grande Valley FC Toros players
Colombian expatriate footballers
Colombian expatriate sportspeople in the United States
Expatriate soccer players in the United States
Categoría Primera A players
Major League Soccer players
Association football midfielders
USL Championship players
Footballers from Cali